Walter atte Keye was a late-fourteenth-century brewer of Wood Street in the City of London. He is best known as one of the leaders of the 1381 Peasants' Revolt in London.

On 14 June 1381 Keye attempted to steal and destroy the Common Council's book of ordinances, called le Jubyle, or Jubilee Book. It was stored in a sheriff's compter. The rebels also attacked the Guildhall and other civic buildings first and at least the former he attempted to burn down. Since the book was subsequently burned by a later Mayor of London, Nicholas Exton, little is known of its contents of the book.  Historians have been unable to ascertain Keye's motive for his "frenzied" search for it. Keye also appears to have personally led a small armed force to the Milk Street sheriff's compter, which they assaulted and despoiled. Keye also took advantage of the general turmoil of the time to extort money from fellow brewers. He and his associates have been described by Barrie Dobson as showing that there was at least one rebel group "prepared to challenge the authority of the civic hierarchy as well as that of royal officials and agents."

Notes

References

Bibliography
 
 
 
 

 
 

14th-century English people
Peasants' Revolt
Brewing in London